Panoptic Modes is the third studio album led by American pianist Vijay Iyer originally released on the Red Giant label in 2001 and re-released on Pi Recordings in 2010.

Reception

The Allmusic review by David R. Adler stated, "His harmonic and formal concepts are as challenging as ever, yet his exceedingly difficult writing is rendered oddly accessible by the unperturbed facility of his band". Writing for All About Jazz, Jim Santella said, "Vijay Iyer's music contains the adventurousness and dramatic tension that you'd expect from avant-garde jazz; as well as a light, rhythmic swing, for those of us who live in the mainstream. His third album is accessible to one and all. They're his originals, and they're interpreted by a stellar quartet".

Track listing
All compositions by Vijay Iyer
 "Invocation" - 6:07
 "Configurations" - 6:41
 "One Thousand and One" - 8:30
 "History Is Alive" - 4:41
 "Father Spirit" - 6:19
 "Atlantean Tropes" - 6:54
 "Numbers (For Mumia)" - 1:43
 "Trident: 2001" - 7:16
 "Circular Argument" - 4:47
 "Invariants" - 8:19
 "Mountains" - 4:41

Personnel
 Vijay Iyer — piano
 Rudresh Mahanthappa — alto saxophone
 Stephan Crump — bass
 Derrek Phillips — drums

References

2001 albums
Vijay Iyer albums
Pi Recordings albums
Instrumental albums